Willy Jozef Vincent (born 18 November 1966) is a Mauritian former footballer who is last known to have played as a forward for . Besides Mauritius, he has played in Belgium.

Career

Vincent started his career with Mauritian side Fire Brigade. Before the second half of 1991–92, Vincent signed for Antwerp in the Belgian top flight, where he made 46 appearances and scored 4 goals, helping them win the 1991–92 Belgian Cup. On 14 February 1992, he debuted for Antwerp during a 2-8 loss to Beerschot. On 14 February 1992, Vincent scored his first goal for Antwerp during a 2-8 loss to Beerschot.

References

External links
 

1966 births
Living people
Mauritian footballers
Royal Antwerp F.C. players
Hapoel Beit She'an F.C. players
K. Berchem Sport players
Belgian Pro League players
Liga Leumit players
Association football forwards
Mauritian expatriate footballers
Mauritius international footballers
Expatriate footballers in Belgium
Expatriate footballers in Israel
Mauritian expatriate sportspeople in Belgium
Mauritian expatriate sportspeople in Israel